TV1 (in ), formerly Algerian Television (in ) then The Terrestrial Channel (in ), is the first Algerian general public network of Établissement public de télévision (EPTV) formerly Établissement national de télévision (ENTV), along with TV2, TV3, TV4, TV5, TV6, TV7, TV8 and  
TV9.

It started to broadcast its programs on 24 December 1956, during the French colonial period in Algeria. It is one of the most important television channels in Algeria, and produces entertainment and variety programs in addition to several Algerian series and films. Its main headquarters are in Algiers.

History

The Radiodiffusion-Télévision Française began the broadcasting of Télévision Algérienne on December 24, 1956 in the French departments of Algeria by inaugurating its first VHF television transmitter of 819 installed Cap Matifou, in front of Algiers, that is retired of fifteen kilometers of distance.

Établissement national de télévision, the owner of Télévision Algérienne, is the most important media organ in Algeria. It is a public information and communication institution that carries out the main tasks determined by a book of conditions whereby it monitors the official activities of state institutions by reporting and broadcasting as required by the public interest of the country. The sovereignty of the Establishment was restored from the French colonization on 28 October 1962, after the independence of Algeria on 5 July 1962.

Télévision Algérienne was the only national television channel in Algeria until 1994 when Canal Algérie (now TV2), a French version of its big sister, launched by the satellites Hot Bird and Astra, was launched for Algerian immigrants who wanted news of the corn. On 5 July 2001, a third channel A3, joined the ensemble, followed on 18 March 2009 by two new channels: Channel 4 and Coran TV ENTV.

Evolution of network names  
 1956–1962: R.T.F. Télévision Alger (means: R.T.F. Algiers Television)
 1962–1986: الإذاعة والتلفزيون الجزائري (DIN 31635: āl-idaā wā ātilifizyoun al-Jazā’iri (means: Algerian Radio and Television)
 1986–present: التلفزيون الجزائري (DIN 31635: ātilifizyoun al-Jazā’iri, means: Algerian Television)

Programming 
Télévision Algérienne programs consist of informing, educating and distracting by broadcasting all reports, programs and programs relating to national, regional, local and international life, as well as current issues and problems.

Foreign TV series
 100 Deeds for Eddie McDowd

Animes
 Chibi Maruko-chan

References

External links
  
 
 
 
 

Arabic-language television stations
Television stations in Algeria
1956 establishments in Algeria
Television channels and stations established in 1956
State media